Paula Beatriz Pereira (born 11 March 1988) is a Brazilian female badminton player. She competed at the 2007 and 2015 Pan American Games. At the Brazilian National Badminton Championships, she won the women's singles title in 2011; women's doubles title in 2006, 2007, 2008, 2009, 2012, and 2014; and in the mixed doubles title in 2012.

Achievements

Pan Am Championships
Women's doubles

Mixed doubles

BWF International Challenge/Series
Women's doubles

Mixed doubles

 BWF International Challenge tournament
 BWF International Series tournament
 BWF Future Series tournament

References

External links 
 
 Confederação Brasileira de Badminton Atleta

Living people
1988 births
Sportspeople from Rio de Janeiro (city)
Brazilian female badminton players
Pan American Games competitors for Brazil
Badminton players at the 2007 Pan American Games
Badminton players at the 2015 Pan American Games
South American Games silver medalists for Brazil
South American Games bronze medalists for Brazil
South American Games medalists in badminton
Competitors at the 2010 South American Games
21st-century Brazilian women